is a 2007 Japanese youth romantic drama film directed by Hideyuki Hirayama.

Cast
 Taichi Kokubun as Mitsuba Konjakutei
 Karina as Satsuki Tokawa
 Yutaka Matsushige as Taichi Yugawara
 Yuki Morinaga as Suguru Murabayashi
 Kaoru Yachigusa as Haruko Toyama
 Shirō Itō as Kosanmon Konjakutei

References

External links
 

2007 films
Films directed by Hideyuki Hirayama
Japanese romantic drama films
2007 romantic drama films
Films with screenplays by Satoko Okudera
2000s Japanese films